Galápagos Cove is the small, 210 m wide cove indenting for 70 m the northeast coast of Greenwich Island in the South Shetland Islands, Antarctica and entered between Spark Point and Figueroa Point.

The feature is named after the Galápagos Islands, Ecuador.

Location

Maps
 L.L. Ivanov et al. Antarctica: Livingston Island and Greenwich Island, South Shetland Islands. Scale 1:100000 topographic map. Sofia: Antarctic Place-names Commission of Bulgaria, 2005.
 L.L. Ivanov. Antarctica: Livingston Island and Greenwich, Robert, Snow and Smith Islands. Scale 1:120000 topographic map.  Troyan: Manfred Wörner Foundation, 2009.

References
 SCAR Composite Antarctic Gazetteer.

Coves of Greenwich Island